La Rochelle is a locality within the Rural Municipality of De Salaberry in south-eastern Manitoba, Canada.  It is located approximately 60 kilometers (37 miles) south of Winnipeg. Established by Métis families in 1859, La Rochelle is the oldest community of the Rural Municipality of De Salaberry.

La Rochelle was the site of a small prisoner-of-war camp that held German soldiers captured during World War II.

References 

Localities in Manitoba
World War II prisoner-of-war camps in Canada

Unincorporated communities in Eastman Region, Manitoba